Siskiwitia alticolans is a moth in the family Cosmopterigidae. It was described by Ronald W. Hodges in 1969. It is found in North America, where it has been recorded from Arizona and Texas.

The thorax and forewings are black with a transverse,
white band at two-thirds length of the wing. The hindwings are shining dark gray. Adults have been recorded on wing in July and August.

References

Moths described in 1969
Chrysopeleiinae